The 2017–18 Cal State Northridge Matadors men's basketball team represented California State University, Northridge (also known as CSUN) during the 2017–18 NCAA Division I men's basketball season. The Matadors, led by fifth-year head coach Reggie Theus, played their home games at the Matadome as members of the Big West Conference. They finished the season 6–24, 3–13 in Big West play to finish in last place. They failed to qualify for the Big West tournament.

On March 6, 2018, the school fired head coach Reggie Theus, along with Athletic Director Brandon Martin following a heated verbal exchange between the two following the dismissal of Theus. On March 13, the school hired former NC State coach Mark Gottfried as head coach.

Previous season
The Matadors finished the 2016–17 season 11–19, 7–9 in Big West play to finish in sixth place. In the Big West tournament, they lost to Cal State Fullerton in the quarterfinals.

Offseason

Departures

Incoming transfers

2017 recruiting class

Roster

Schedule and results

|-
!colspan=9 style=| Non-conference regular season

|-
!colspan=9 style=| Big West regular season

References

Cal State Northridge Matadors men's basketball seasons
Cal State Northridge